Cheung Cheun-Nam, known professionally as Yuen Qiu (born 19 April 1950), is a Hong Kong actress and martial artist. She is an expert of both Chinese martial arts and Beijing-opera skills, and was apprenticed at the Peking Opera School under the same master, Yu Jim-yuen, as Jackie Chan and Sammo Hung.

Early life 
On 19 April 1950, Yuen was born as Cheung Cheun-Nam in Hong Kong.
Yuen was given the performance name of Yuen Qiu.

Education 
Yuen attended a Peking Opera School in Kowloon, Hong Kong.

Career 
Yuen was a stuntwoman and a night club performer from the late 1960s to early 1970s. 

In 1974, Yuen had a small role in the international production, The Man with the Golden Gun (1974), portraying as Hip's niece Nara rescuing Roger Moore as James Bond.

In 1979, Yuen was able to demonstrate her acrobatic and kicking abilities in Dragon's Claw.
In 1970s, there were limited opportunities for stuntwomen.

After being away from the Hong Kong film industry for nearly 20 years, she landed a role in Kung Fu Hustle only by chance. She was accompanying a junior woman fellow of the China Drama Academy at the audition but the director's eye was on her. It was reported that Stephen Chow convinced her to take on the role only after unremitting and persistent persuasion.

Yuen later appeared in the movie Kung Fu Mahjong, with Yuen Wah, and has been active in cinema since then.

Personal life 
In 1985, Yuen was married to martial arts director Lu Chun-koo (魯俊谷) and has a son and a daughter. Yuen and Lu divorced in 1995.

On 31 March 2005, Yuen was arrested along with 10 other women and two men for illegal gambling.

Filmography

See also 
 Yu Jim-yuen
 Wuxia film

References

External links
 
 Yuen Qiu at chinesemov.com
 Yuen Qiu at Simonyam.com

1948 births
Living people
Place of birth missing (living people)
20th-century Hong Kong actresses
21st-century Hong Kong actresses